Dendrocnide corallodesme, the mango-leafed stinger, is a species of flowering plant in the nettle family Urticaceae, native to New Guinea and Queensland. It is a rainforest tree reaching , with irritating hairs on its flowers and abaxial leaf midribs.

References

corallodesme
Flora of New Guinea
Flora of Queensland
Plants described in 1965